A Stable Reference is the second studio album by American post-rock band Labradford, released on May 23, 1995 by Kranky.

Reception

Reviewing A Stable Reference for AllMusic, Ned Raggett stated, "The biggest change on Reference has remained a near-constant ever since, namely, the removal of lyrics and vocal parts from almost all tracks, outside of some extremely understated and intentionally buried in-the-mix-bits scattered throughout the record." He also noted a greater focus on "mix complexity, with subtle yet important sonic elements and samples scattered throughout the songs", concluding that "in the end, Reference already points to the increasingly more challenging albums in Labradford's near future." Deborah Sprague of Trouser Press wrote that the band's "penchant for psychic drift still exists... but Labradford's paths seem a little more clear-cut the second time around".

Track listing

Personnel
Adapted from the A Stable Reference liner notes.

Labradford
 Carter Brown – keyboards
 Robert Donne – bass guitar
 Mark Nelson – vocals, guitar

Production and additional personnel
 Rob Christiansen – recording, mixing

Release history

References

External links
 

1995 albums
Labradford albums
Kranky albums
Flying Nun Records albums